Chauharjan Devi Temple also known as Barahi Devi is a Hindu temple of mother goddess Barahi or Chauharjan Devi, located in village Chauharjan in Pratapgarh, Uttar Pradesh. The temple is located on the holy bank of river Sai.

See also 

Nandmahar Dham
Mata Mawai Dham

References 

Hindu temples in Pratapgarh district, Uttar Pradesh